Kuchinda is the town and a notified area council in Sambalpur district in the Indian state of Odisha. Kuchinda is famous for its "Dushera". Kuchinda is also famous for the Gudguda waterfall. Most of the people of Kuchinda sub-division depends on farming. Kuchinda is more of a tribal area.

Geography
It has an average elevation of 220 metres (721 feet). National Highway 200 passes through the city. Nearby residential areas include Saida, Ghosa, Mantrimunda, Lad, Mahuldihi, Kira, Bandubas, Satkama and Lingapali.

Demographics
 census, Kuchinda had a population of 15,576. Males constituted 51% of the population and females 49%. Kuchinda has an average literacy rate of 66%, higher than the national average of 59.5%: Male literacy is 71% and female literacy is 60%. 12% of the population is under 6 years of age. Purunapani is the most educated village of western Odisha, which is situated in Kuchinda block.

Transport 
Airports: Jharsuguda Airport  - 

Railway stations: Bagdihi (Odisha, Jharsuguda, Laikera 31 km), Jharsuguda junction 48 km, Jharsuguda,
Panpali (Odisha, Jharsuguda, Kirmira 32 km) Rourkela 
(Odisha, Sundargarh 83 km)

Politics
The MLA from Kuchinda (ST) Assembly Constituency is Kishor Chandar Naik of BJD.

Kuchinda is part of Sambalpur (Lok Sabha constituency). And Nitesh Ganga Deb is the Member of Parliament of Sambalpur lok sabha constituency.

References

Cities and towns in Sambalpur district